Lying is a 2011 long-form essay book by American author and neuroscience expert Sam Harris. Harris argues that we can radically simplify our lives and improve society by merely telling the truth in situations where others often lie.

Reception
Jim Danielson of the Lincoln Journal Star praised Lying, writing, "One of the real values of reading this book is that it causes the reader to reflect on our own life and lies."  He added, "This book is a quick read, but it is long on contemplating life."

References

External links
Lying by Sam Harris

Lying
2011 essays
American essays
Books by Sam Harris
2011 non-fiction books